Man on the Moon is a 1999 biographical comedy-drama film about the late American entertainer Andy Kaufman, starring Jim Carrey as Kaufman. The film was directed by Miloš Forman and also features Danny DeVito, Courtney Love, and Paul Giamatti.

The story traces Kaufman's steps from childhood through the comedy clubs and television appearances that made him famous, including his memorable appearances on Saturday Night Live, Late Night with David Letterman, Fridays, and his role as Latka Gravas on the sitcom Taxi, which was popular among viewers but disruptive for Kaufman's co-stars. The film pays particular attention to the various inside jokes, scams, put-ons, and happenings for which Kaufman was famous, most significantly his long-running "feud" with wrestler Jerry "The King" Lawler and his portrayal of the character of bawdy lounge singer Tony Clifton.

It was released on December 22, 1999, in the United States and May 5, 2000, in the United Kingdom by Universal Pictures and Warner Bros. Pictures in some markets. Although the film was unsuccessful commercially and received mixed reviews, Carrey received critical acclaim for his performance and won a Golden Globe, his second in a row after his award for The Truman Show. His win was in the Musical or Comedy category.

The documentary Jim & Andy: The Great Beyond was released in 2017 and chronicles Carrey's performance as Kaufman in the film, a performance he maintained during much of the film's production.

Plot
Andy Kaufman is a struggling performer whose act fails in nightclubs because, while the audience wants comedy, he sings children's songs and refuses to tell conventional jokes. As the audience begins to believe that Kaufman may have no real talent, his previously timid "foreign man" character puts on a rhinestone jacket and does a dead-on Elvis impersonation. The audience bursts into applause, realizing Kaufman had tricked them.

Kaufman catches the eye of talent agent George Shapiro, who signs him as a client and immediately lands him a network television series, Taxi, much to Kaufman's dismay, as he doesn't like sitcoms. Because of the money, visibility, and a promise that he can do his own television special, Kaufman accepts the role, turning his foreign man into a mechanic named Latka Gravas. Secretly, he hates doing the show and expresses a desire to quit.

Invited to catch a different act at a nightclub, Shapiro witnesses a performance by a rude, loud-mouthed lounge singer, Tony Clifton, whom Kaufman wants to guest-star on Taxi. Clifton's bad attitude is matched by his horrible appearance and demeanor. But backstage, when he meets Shapiro in person, Clifton takes off his sunglasses and reveals that he is actually Kaufman. Clifton is a "villain character" created by Kaufman and his creative partner, Bob Zmuda. Once again, the gag is on the audience.

Kaufman's profile increases with appearances on Saturday Night Live, but he has problems with his newfound fame. When performing live, audiences dislike his strange anti-humor and demand that he perform as Latka. At one show, he deliberately antagonizes attendees by reading The Great Gatsby aloud from start to finish. Kaufman shows up on the Taxi set as Clifton and proceeds to cause chaos until he is removed from the set. He relates to Shapiro that he never knows exactly how to entertain an audience "short of faking my own death or setting the theater on fire."

Kaufman decides to become a professional wrestler — but to emphasize the "villain" angle, he will wrestle only women (hired actresses) and then berate them after winning, declaring himself "Inter-Gender Wrestling Champion." He becomes smitten with one woman he wrestles, Lynne Margulies, and they begin a romantic relationship. His professional issues are deepened when, during an appearance on ABC's live television comedy show Fridays, Kaufman refuses to speak his lines.

Kaufman feuds publicly with Jerry Lawler, a male professional star wrestler, who challenges him to a "real wrestling match", which Kaufman accepts. Lawler easily overpowers and appears to seriously injure Kaufman. Lawler and an injured Kaufman (wearing a neck brace) appear on NBC's Late Night with David Letterman, ostensibly to call a truce, but instead, the feud escalates and they trade insults before getting into another fight. Kaufman pays the price when he is voted off from SNL following a vote of audience members, weary and bored of his wrestling antics. Shapiro advises Kaufman and Lawler, who are actually the best of friends and have staged the whole feud as a joke, that he thinks they should never work together again. Shapiro later calls Kaufman to inform him that Taxi has been canceled, though Kaufman is not at all bothered.

After a show at a comedy club, Kaufman calls together Lynne, Zmuda, and Shapiro to disclose that he has been diagnosed with a rare form of lung cancer and may die soon. Initially, they are not sure whether to believe this, thinking it could be yet another Kaufman stunt, with Zmuda actually believing a fake death would be a fantastic prank. With little time to live, Kaufman arranges a booking at Carnegie Hall, his dream venue. The performance is a memorable success, culminating with Kaufman inviting the entire audience out for milk and cookies. As his health deteriorates rapidly, a desperate Kaufman heads to the Philippines to seek a medical miracle through psychic surgery, only to find it a hoax, laughing at the irony. He dies soon after. At Kaufman's funeral, friends and loved ones sing along to "This Friendly World" with a video of Kaufman. 

One year later, in 1985, Tony Clifton appears at Kaufman's tribute at The Comedy Store's main stage, performing "I Will Survive", while Zmuda watches in the audience.

Cast

 Jim Carrey as Andy Kaufman / Tony Clifton / Latka Gravas
 Danny DeVito as George Shapiro
 Courtney Love as Lynne Margulies
 Paul Giamatti as Bob Zmuda / Tony Clifton
 Gerry Becker as Stanley Kaufman
 Leslie Lyles as Janice Kaufman
 George Shapiro as Mr. Besserman
 Richard Belzer as himself
 Patton Oswalt as Blue Collar Guy
 Melanie Vesey as Carol Kaufman
 Michael Kelly as Michael Kaufman
 Vincent Schiavelli as Maynard Smith
 Peter Bonerz as Ed Weinberger
 Michael Villani as Merv Griffin
 Bob Zmuda as Jack Burns
 Tracey Walter as National Enquirer Editor

Several original members of the cast of Taxi, including Marilu Henner, Judd Hirsch, Christopher Lloyd, Carol Kane, and Jeff Conaway make cameos, playing themselves. Danny DeVito, who was also in the cast of Taxi, co-starred in the film but did not appear as himself.

Many of Kaufman's other real-life friends and co-stars also appear in the film (although not all as themselves), including Zmuda, Shapiro, Margulies, David Letterman, Paul Shaffer, professional wrestler Jerry Lawler, wrestling announcers Jim Ross and Lance Russell, The Improv founder Budd Friedman, Saturday Night Live creator Lorne Michaels, and actors Vincent Schiavelli and Chad Whitson. Michael Richards is played by Norm Macdonald in a recreation of the Fridays show skit. According to Jerry Lawler's autobiography It's Good to be the King ... sometimes, WCW wrestler Glenn Gilbertti, better known to wrestling fans as Disco Inferno, was considered for the role of Lawler.

Kevin Spacey, Edward Norton, John Cusack and Hank Azaria auditioned for the role of Andy Kaufman.

Production
Man on the Moon was shot in Los Angeles in the winter of 1998. The film's production is notable for Carrey's rigid method acting, staying in-character as Kaufman both on and off the set for the duration of production. Carrey's adherence to the role reached the extent where he would develop unscripted tics and habits that were previously characteristic of Kaufman himself. Among other examples, Courtney Love noted how Carrey would stuff his clothing with Limburger cheese on the set when playing Kaufman's Tony Clifton character in the film, something Kaufman had done in his own performances of the character.

A documentary, Jim & Andy: The Great Beyond, was released in November 2017. Using behind-the-scenes footage, the documentary covers the production of Man on the Moon with a particular focus on Carrey's overwrought method-acting as Kaufman.

Soundtrack

The soundtrack for the film was written by rock band R.E.M., whose 1992 song "Man on the Moon" (originally written in honor of Kaufman) gave the film its title. The soundtrack also included the Grammy-nominated song "The Great Beyond", which remains the band's highest-charting single in the United Kingdom.

Historical accuracy
The film makes a few changes to Kaufman's life story. As Kaufman (played by Carrey) explains in the film's prologue, "All the most important things in my life are changed around and mixed up for dramatic purposes."

The famous Carnegie Hall "milk and cookies" performance, portrayed in the film as one of his last performances after being diagnosed with cancer, had in fact occurred in 1979, five years before Kaufman's death and well before his diagnosis. Also, the film is deliberately ambiguous over whether Kaufman actually died or if this was a hoax as some fans believe.

The film implies that Carol Kane was a member of the Taxi cast during the show's first season, which in real life was 1978–79. In actuality, Kane did not make her first appearance on the series until the episode "Guess Who's Coming for Brefnish", which first aired on ABC in January 1980 during the show's second season. The film implies that Taxi was canceled only once. However, the show went on for one more season on NBC.

Other inaccuracies include scenes supposedly drawn from SNL, specifically the first episode's host, who is depicted as having been Richard Belzer but was George Carlin in real life. Belzer also erroneously refers to the show as "Saturday Night Live" during the sequence, but that title wasn't adopted until season two. The scene where Lorne Michaels asks the home viewing audience to vote Kaufman off the show happened in 1982, two years after Michaels left the show as executive producer and Dick Ebersol took over.

After its release, the film attracted some criticism over various events in Kaufman's life that were left out. Max Allan Collins maintained that the filmmakers did not understand Kaufman, and that the film "does not give Kaufman the credit for his genius, that he had a complete intellectual grasp of what he was up to and a showman's instincts for how to play an audience." Significantly, these critics included Kaufman's own father Stanley, who was displeased that little of Andy's early life (before show business) and early career were portrayed.

Sam Simon, season 5 writer on Taxi, stated in a 2013 interview with Marc Maron for the WTF with Marc Maron podcast that the portrayal of Andy on the show was "a complete fiction," that Kaufman was "completely professional" and that he "told you Tony Clifton was him." Simon also stated that sources for these stories were mostly from Bob Zmuda and a "little bit of press and hype," but conceded that Kaufman would have "loved" Zmuda's version of events. However, in 2020, Screen Rant journalist Kayla Mosley backed claims that Kaufman was sometimes difficult to work with while he was on Taxi, and noted that he would only work two times a week on the set, in contrast to the five days a week the other cast and crew members of Taxi worked. Kaufman was also reluctant to work on the sitcom and was allowed to appear in only 14 episodes per season as part of his deal with the show's executives. As of 2020, occasional Taxi actress Carol Kane was the only Taxi cast member to have acknowledged attending his funeral.

Reception
On review aggregator website Rotten Tomatoes, the film has an approval rating of 64% based on 122 reviews, with an average rating of 6.2/10. The site's critical consensus reads, "Jim Carrey is eerily dead-on in his portrayal of Andy Kaufman, which helps to elevate Man on the Moon above the script's formulaic biopic cliches." Metacritic, which uses a weighted average, assigned a score of 58 out of 100, based on 34 critics, indicating "mixed or average reviews". Audiences polled by CinemaScore gave the film an average grade of "B−" on an A+ to F scale.

Roger Ebert, giving the film three-and-a-half stars out of four, wrote for the Chicago Sun Times: 

Man on the Moon ended a string of Jim Carrey films that had very successful opening weekends, and grossed just $47 million against a budget of $82 million. Although the film received mixed reviews from critics, they were near unanimous in their praise for Jim Carrey's portrayal of Andy Kaufman. Carrey won a Golden Globe for his performance, and the film was nominated for Best Musical or Comedy as well.

References

External links

 
 
 
 
 
 

1999 films
1990s English-language films
English-language German films
English-language Japanese films
1990s biographical drama films
1999 comedy-drama films
American biographical drama films
American comedy-drama films
British biographical drama films
British comedy-drama films
German biographical drama films
German comedy-drama films
Japanese biographical drama films
Japanese comedy-drama films
Biographical films about entertainers
Comedy-drama films based on actual events
Films directed by Miloš Forman
Films featuring a Best Musical or Comedy Actor Golden Globe winning performance
Puppet films
Films produced by Danny DeVito
Films set in the 1950s
Films set in the 1970s
Films set in the 1980s
Films set in the Philippines
Films shot in Los Angeles
R.E.M.
Films with screenplays by Scott Alexander and Larry Karaszewski
Self-reflexive films
Mutual Film Company films
Universal Pictures films
Warner Bros. films
Films shot in the Philippines
Films about comedians
Cultural depictions of Andy Kaufman
1990s American films
1990s British films
1990s Japanese films
1990s German films
Films scored by musical groups